Apostolos Konstantopoulos (born 2 August 2002) is a Greek professional footballer who plays as a centre-back for Belgian club Beerschot.

Career
He played for Panetolikos youth academy for almost 13 years, before he start playing with the senior team. On 6 July 2020, he scored his first goal with the club in an away 2-2 draw with Atromitos F.C., and subsequently became the youngest football player to play in the Greek playoffs, the youngest to score in 2020-21 season, but also the youngest in the history of the club. 

On 18 June 2021, Beerschot announced the acquisition of the 18-year-old central defender from a €500.000 transfer fee, who signed a contract until 2024 with the possibility of extending their cooperation for another year. The young defender last season played 26 times in all competitions, in his first full season with the Panetolikos.

References

2002 births
Living people
Greek footballers
Greece under-21 international footballers
Greece youth international footballers
Super League Greece players
Panetolikos F.C. players
Association football defenders
Footballers from Agrinio